By The Great Horn Spoon is a children's novel by Sid Fleischman, published in 1963. It tells the story of a 12-year-old boy and his English butler and their adventures in the California Gold Rush. It was adapted into the Disney film The Adventures of Bullwhip Griffin, starring Roddy McDowall and Suzanne Pleshette. Because of its setting, the novel is recommended by the California Department of Education as a literary selection for classroom use.

Plot
Twelve-year-old Jack heads to California to search for gold after his Aunt Arabella loses all her money. He is accompanied by Aunt Arabella's butler, Praiseworthy. They plan to pay for passage on the ship Lady Wilma, but when a criminal named Cut-Eye Higgins steals their money, they stow away instead. Captain Swain catches them and forces them to work for their passage in the coal bunkers. While there, they meet Dr. Buckbee, who possesses a map of the gold fields. Cut-Eye Higgins steals the map and escapes in one of the lifeboats. During the journey, the Lady Wilma sails around Cape Horn and wins a race against a ship called the Sea Raven.

After arriving in California, Praiseworthy and Jack give a miner named Quartz Jackson a haircut. Quartz Jackson teaches them how to pan for gold and finds some gold dust in his beard. He gives the gold dust to Praiseworthy, who puts it into his left glove. Praiseworthy and Jack board a stagecoach for the gold fields, only to discover Cut-Eye Higgins on the same journey. Highwaymen hold up the stagecoach and one tries to take Aunt Arabella's picture from Praiseworthy. Praiseworthy knocks him uphill with a punch from his left glove, which was weighted by the gold dust. The robbers take Higgins' coat, which contains the map. 

Jack and Praiseworthy arrive in Hangtown and have several adventures. When news of Praiseworthy's fight with the robbers reaches the locals, the miners give him the nickname "Bullwhip". A brawler named Mountain Ox challenges Praiseworthy to a boxing match.  

Jack buys a rifle and goes on a hunting trip, where he falls down a coyote hole and is rescued by one of the stagecoach robbers, who is wearing Cut-Eye Higgins' coat. Jack takes the coat, but the map is no longer there. Jack and Praiseworthy track Higgins to a mining town called Shirt-Tail Camp, where Higgins has become the local dentist. They arrive just in time to see Higgins being sentenced to hanging for stealing a horse. Eager to find the map, they negotiate for his release. The Justice of the Peace agrees to postpone the hanging until another dentist can be found, but still orders Jack and Praiseworthy to dig Higgins' grave. As they dig, they find gold. Afterward, they sell their burro to the Justice of the Peace and turn in their mining tools. They return to Hangtown, where Praiseworthy wins his fight with the Mountain Ox.

The next day, as they are planning to leave, Jack sees his two sisters and his Aunt Arabella. Arabella agrees to marry Praiseworthy, who plans to become the first lawyer in the West.

Film adaptation

In 1967, Walt Disney Pictures adapted By the Great Horn Spoon into a movie called The Adventures of Bullwhip Griffin. Bryan Russell starred as Jack and Roddy McDowall played "Eric Griffin," the new name for the butler character. Suzanne Pleshette played Aunt Arabella, who in this version follows them to California and becomes a singer in a saloon. The character of Cut-Eye Higgins was changed from a criminal to a corrupt judge and portrayed by Karl Malden.

References

1963 American novels
Children's historical novels
American children's novels
American historical novels
California Gold Rush in fiction
American novels adapted into films
1963 children's books